is a horizontally scrolling shooter arcade video game developed and released by Irem in 1987 and the first game in the R-Type series. The player controls a star ship, the R-9 "Arrowhead", in its efforts to destroy the Bydo, a powerful alien race bent on wiping out all of mankind. The R-9 can acquire a glowing orbicular device called a "Force", protecting it from enemy fire and providing additional firepower. The arcade version was distributed by Nintendo in North America; it is the last arcade title Nintendo distributed.

R-Type was the first game to run on Irem's 16-bit M72 arcade system. Initially a joke among staff, the Force was based on dung beetles. The development team drew inspiration from Gradius, Aliens and works by H.R. Giger. The music was composed by Masato Ishizaki, while character designs were by "AKIO". The game's title stems from the word "ray", as in a ray of light, in reference to the player's raylike weapons used throughout the game.

R-Type was commercially successful and celebrated by critics for its graphics and addictive gameplay, but was criticized for its difficulty. It is commonly cited as one of the best shoot 'em up video games, and one of the greatest video games of all time. Its success inspired several sequel and spinoff games, and home ports and releases for digital distribution services. A remake of the game was released as R-Type DX for the Game Boy Color in 2000. A 3D remake, R-Type Dimensions, was released for the Xbox 360 in 2009; for the PlayStation 3 in 2014; for Microsoft Windows, the Nintendo Switch and the PlayStation 4 in 2018; and for iOS in 2019.

Gameplay

The game has a generally slower pace than similar shooting games of the time and emphasizes enemy pattern memorization as much as player speed. It is composed of eight levels, with a boss enemy at the end of each. The player controls a small spacecraft and must navigate terrain and fight enemies using the various ship weapons. The player's spacecraft has, by default, a weak but rapid-firing main gun; and a more powerful gun called a wave cannon, which requires the player to hold their fire to build up power for the cannon.

During the game, the player can obtain an auxiliary device called a Force. This resembles a glowing orange ball. The Force can be attached to the front or back of the player's spacecraft, or detached to fly freely. When attached, the Force provides one of three different powerful weapons, in addition to the main gun and the wave cannon.

When detached, these weapons cannot be used, but the Force will instead resort to a secondary set of guns, which can be fired by the player even if the Force is at a distance from the spacecraft. The Force has a secondary use as a shield; it is completely indestructible and can block most things fired at it, as well as damage or destroy enemies on contact. The inspiration for the Force came partly from a joke, where AKIBO (the designer), was envisioning the behavior of a dung beetle.

The R- in the series title stands for "ray", as in a ray of light, in reference to the many different types of rayed weapons that players use in the series. Another theory suggests that "R-Type" refers to Bydo as r-strategists in r/K selection theory.

Development

Development on the Commodore 64 version began when Activision's Electric Dreams Software subsidiary obtained the rights. David Jolliff was planning on to program the game with James Smart assisting in program help. The original version was shelved, and as a result of the settlement between the creators of Katakis and Activision, Manfred Trenz of Rainbow Arts had the right to do a port, which was made in six weeks.

Release
Hudson Soft developed a fairly accurate port of R-Type that was released for the TurboGrafx-16 (a.k.a. PC Engine) console, although it suffered from a slightly lower resolution, reduced colour palette, sprite flickering and slowdown. Due to the slightly reduced resolution, the playfield also scrolls slightly in the vertical axis whenever the player's ship approaches the top or bottom of the screen. The TurboGrafx-16 version of R-Type has a boss at the end of Stage 6, rather than a prolonged wave of enemies as in all other versions.

The Xbox Live Arcade game R-Type Dimensions was released on February 4, 2009, by Tozai Games. It is a port of the original R-Type and the sequel R-Type II. It can be played either with the original 2D graphics or with new 3D graphics, and has added co-op gameplay functionality. An analogous version for PS3 has been released in May, 2014.

The TurboGrafx-16 version of R-Type was one of the first games confirmed for Nintendo's Virtual Console. The Japanese release for the Wii is split between two downloads, mirroring the original format of the game. The Japanese releases for the Nintendo 3DS and Wii U use the North American version instead of the Japanese one, presenting the game as a single download; however, the game was removed from the Nintendo 3DS and Wii U stores on July 30, 2020.

The Master System version became available as well on the Virtual Console for Japan on May 19, 2009, for North America on November 2, 2009, and for Europe on September 25, 2009; however, due to licensing issues, this version was delisted on September 30, 2011, in North America and Europe and October 18, 2011, in Japan.

In 2010, DotEmu developed an iOS port of R-Type, published by Electronic Arts, released also for Android in September 2011.

Tozai Games returned in 2018 and re-issued an updated digital-only release of "R-Type Dimensions", now carrying the title "R-Type Dimensions EX", now landing on Steam, PlayStation 4 and Nintendo Switch. Strictly Limited Games released physical copies of the PlayStation 4 and Nintendo Switch versions in February 2019. These were limited to 2,000 and 3,000 copies respectively. Collector's Edition variants were also issued which contained a hardcover artbook, dog tags, stickers and cards, once again limited to 1,000 on the PlayStation 4 and 2,000 on the Nintendo Switch.

Reception

Arcade
In Japan, Game Machine listed R-Type on their August 1, 1987 issue as being the most-successful table arcade cabinet of the month. It went on to be Japan's highest-grossing table arcade game of 1987. Later in 1988, it was the year's third highest-grossing arcade conversion kit and sixth highest overall arcade game.

The original R-Type was well received by most gaming critics. However, it was also infamous for its relentless difficulty. Clare Edgeley of Computer and Video Games selected R-Type as the "game of the month" in July 1987. The following month, Commodore User magazine gave it a highly positive review and noted that it drew large crowds queuing up at arcades.

Consoles
According to Mega Guide in 1992, R-Type had sold "squillions on hand-held".

A successful 1988 port to the Master System was immediately recognized as one of the best games available in the Sega library. A Mean Machines magazine review praised in particular the graphics and the high quality of the challenge offered by the game, awarding it an overall rating of 92%. In 1989, ACE listed it as one of the top five best games available for both the PC Engine and Master System.

A 1995 article in Next Generation stated that the "PC Engine [TurboGrafx-16] conversion of Irem's arcade smash R-Type is still regarded as the system's definitive contribution to the shoot 'em up genre." The following year they listed both it and the arcade original (but not any other ports of the game) at number 98 in their "Top 100 Games of All Time", praising its art direction, graphics, design innovations, and huge bosses.

In a retrospective review, Allgame editor Shawn Sackenheim described the TurboGrafx-16 version of R-Type as "(the) most accurate home conversion (of the arcade version) of the game", furthermore stating that "it's the shooter that started it all and it's still a thrill ride from beginning to end".

Computers
The ZX Spectrum version of R-Type was awarded 9/10 in the January 1989 issue of Your Sinclair and was placed at number 6 in their official top 100. The Games Machine praised the "incredible use of colour" and that it "blows away almost every other shoot'em up on the Spectrum". Crash congratulated Electric Dreams for "retaining the frenetic arcade feel and producing such a brilliant game". Sinclair User praised the weapons system and difficulty curve. C+VG concluded their review by saying "an excellent shoot'em up that's both challenging and addictive. An absolute must for Spectrum blasting fanatics".

The game was runner-up in the category of Best 8-Bit Coin-Op Conversion of the Year at the Golden Joystick Awards, behind Operation Wolf.

The implementation of the music in the C64 version was well received, however this port got average reviews due to performance issues and glitches.

Legacy

Irem has developed a number of sequels and related games, including R-Type II and Armed Police Unit Gallop. Their XMultiply, although not part of the series, has similar themes and gameplay, and was released around the same time as R-Type II. However, before any of these games was Katakis, a 1987 clone produced by Factor 5 for the Commodore 64 and the Amiga.

In 1991, Konami released Xexex, a game heavily influenced by R-Type and XMultiply. The game used similar weapons and concepts, such as the "Flint" being a combination of R-Type Force and X Multiply tentacle equipment.

Other games similar to R-Type are Rezon, released by Allumer in 1991, Aicom's Pulstar and Blazing Star (the latter published under Yumekobo) for the Neo Geo, and Technosoft's 1992 title Thunder Force IV for the Sega Genesis.

On April 1, 2019, Granzella announced the development of R-Type Final 2, a sequel to R-Type Final.

A remake of the game has been announced for release exclusively for the Intellivision Amico.

Chris Huelsbeck composed new title songs for Amiga and Commodore 64 versions which have remained as popular targets for game music remixers. Anthem-like Amiga theme is composed by Huelsbeck alone while C64's faster theme is composed by Huelsbeck with Ramiro Vaca.

Adaptations 
 R-9A Arrowhead, Scant, and Dobkeratops appears in the Chapter 30 on the manga Warera Hobby's Famicom Seminar.
 R-Type is one of the video games featured in the manga Rock'n Game Boy, by Shigeto Ikehara, which was published by Comic BomBom from October 1989 to December 1991.

Notes

References

External links 
 R-Type at GameFAQs
 R-Type at Giant Bomb
 R-Type at Killer List of Videogames
 R-Type at MobyGames

 
1987 video games
Arcade video games
Amiga games
Amstrad CPC games
Android (operating system) games
Atari ST games
Commodore 64 games
Game Boy games
Game Boy Color games
Horizontally scrolling shooters
IOS games
Irem games
Java platform games
Master System games
Mobile games
MSX2 games
NEC PC-8801 games
Nintendo arcade games
PlayStation Network games
PlayStation Portable games
Science fiction video games
X68000 games
TurboGrafx-16 games
TurboGrafx-CD games
Video games developed in Japan
Video games scored by Chris Huelsbeck
Video games scored by David Whittaker
Video games scored by Takushi Hiyamuta
Video games set in the 22nd century
Virtual Console games
Virtual Console games for Wii U
Xbox 360 Live Arcade games
ZX Spectrum games
Multiplayer and single-player video games
Nintendo games